"Fearful Pranks Ensue" is the fourth episode of the third season of the anthology television series American Horror Story, which premiered on October 30, 2013, on the cable network FX. This episode is rated TV-MA (LSV).

In this episode, the coven is visited by the Council of Witchcraft after they are notified of Madison (Emma Roberts)'s disappearance. This episode was nominated for a Primetime Emmy Award for Outstanding Sound Mixing for a Miniseries or a Movie.

Plot

Fiona kills Madison and orders her butler, Spaulding, to get rid of the body. Fiona hears noises coming from the greenhouse and discovers a half dead Queenie just as the Minotaur appears. Fiona hauls Queenie up to her room and wakes Cordelia. The two of them frantically try to save Queenie as she dies, but she is quickly resurrected by Fiona. Fiona leaves the room. After Queenie awakes, Delphine LaLaurie thanks her for saving her life. 

As Marie Laveau works, a package arrives at the salon and she discovers the Minotaur's severed head (still alive) in the box. Furious, Marie prepares for the same voodoo ceremony she did in 1961. 

Zoe goes to get Kyle some food and he escapes before she returns. 

Hank is away at a hotel awaiting his mistress, Kaylee. After rough sex, he shoots her in the head without hesitation.

The Council of the Witchcraft arrives at the Academy to discuss the disappearance of Madison. They explain that they were summoned by the clairvoyant Nan. The Council interrogates Fiona, who denies her part in Madison's death while sneering and smiling. After, Myrtle loses her temper and acknowledges that she knows, but can't prove, Fiona killed Anna-Leigh and Madison. A deflated Myrtle demands to know what happened to Madison, and reminds Fiona that punishment for killing another witch is death by fire. Cordelia steps in to defend her mother and reveals that Madison had a heart murmur. After the Council leaves, Fiona and Cordelia head to the bar. Cordelia takes a bathroom break, but a hooded figure appears and throws acid in her face, severely injuring her. 

Back at the Academy, Madame LaLaurie's resurrected daughters appear at the door. The dead surround the house and prepare for an attack as LaLaurie, Zoe, Queenie, Luke, and Nan cower inside.

Reception
"Fearful Pranks Ensue" received a 2.0 18–49 ratings share and was watched by 3.71 million viewers, winning its time slot.

Rotten Tomatoes reports an 86% approval rating, based on 14 reviews. The critical consensus reads, ""Fearful Pranks Ensue" maintains the momentum of previous episodes while further developing emerging narrative threads – and taking full advantage of an outstanding cast." Emily VanDerWerff of The A.V. Club gave the episode a B+ rating, saying, "There is nothing I could say. I could literally write the greatest review in the history of television criticism, and it wouldn't matter. The Golden Corral of terror that is American Horror Story is open for business, and all who attempt to find meaning in it shall be shot." Matt Fowler from IGN gave the episode an 8.2/10 rating, calling it a great episode, saying, "I'm still glad to see that, given the cliffhanger, Halloween night will continue. And that it looks like the best of the ghoulish evening is yet to come."

References

External links

 

2013 American television episodes
Television episodes about adultery
American Horror Story: Coven episodes
Fiction set in 1961
Fiction set in 1971
Halloween television episodes
Television episodes about zombies
Television episodes directed by Michael Uppendahl